ArcExplorer is a lightweight data viewer from ESRI for maps and GIS data in these formats:

 ESRI Shapefile
 ArcInfo coverages
 ArcSDE layers 
 Images
 ArcIMS Services (e.g., Geography Network sources)

ArcExplorer performs a variety of basic GIS functions, including display, query, and data retrieval applications.

The ArcExplorer installation can be freely distributed on spatial data CDs so recipients can view data effectively.

Esri regards ArcGIS Explorer as superseding ArcExplorer.

Versions
ArcExplorer 9.2 Java Edition
ArcExplorer Web
ArcExplorer Java Edition for Education - Created to allow educators using Mac OS X to utilize GIS in the classroom.
ArcExplorer 2

External links
 ESRI's ArcExplorer website  Archived product information page.
 ArcExplorer deprecation notice ESRI deprecation notice for mobile device versions of ArcExplorer.
 ArcExplorer on Microsoft Store for free Windows download.

Footnotes

Freeware
Esri software